A management system is a set of policies, processes and procedures used by an organization to ensure that it can fulfill the tasks required to achieve its objectives. These objectives cover many aspects of the organization's operations (including financial success, safe operation, product quality, client relationships, legislative and regulatory conformance and worker management). For instance, an environmental management system enables organizations to improve their environmental performance, and an occupational safety and health management system enables an organization to control its occupational health and safety risks.

The international standard ISO 9000:2015 (Title: Quality management systems - fundamentals and vocabulary) defines the term in chapter 3.5.3 as a "set of interrelated or interacting elements of an organization to establish policies and objectives, and processes to achieve those objectives".

A simplification of the main aspects of a management system is the 4-element "plan, do, check, act" approach. A complete management system covers every aspect of management and focuses on supporting the performance management to achieve the objectives. The management system should be subject to continuous improvement as the organization learns.

Project - a project as defined in the PRINCE2 (Project Management Methodology), is a temporary organization set up to deliver one or more business products under an agreed Business Case. Taking into account the above definition of the Project, similarly, the Management System is a permanent organization established to implement specific business processes in the enterprise [Definition by Marek Prasoł]. We can distinguish the following types of management systems:

 Quality Management System,
 Risk Management System,
 Information Security Management System,
 Business Continuity Management System,
 a process-oriented organization management system (Business Process Management System)

Examples 
Examples of management system standards include:
ISO 9000: standards for quality management systems (QMS)
 ISO 13485: standard for medical devices
 ISO 14000: standards for environmental management systems
 ISO/IEC 20000: standards for service management systems (SMS)
 ISO 22000: standards for food safety management systems (FSMS)
 ISO/IEC 27000: information security management systems (ISMS)
 ISO 30301: standard for records (information and documentation)
 ISO 37001: standard for anti-bribery
 ISO 45001: standard for occupational health and safety management systems
 ISO 50001: standard for energy management systems
 ISO 55000: standards for asset management systems
 ISO 56002: innovation management systems
FitSM: standards for lightweight IT service management
ILO-OSH: occupational safety and health management systems
 SA8000: social accountability
 IAEA management system safety standards

See also 
 Environmental management system (EMS)
 Lean integration
 Process safety management system (PSMS)
Quality management system (QMS)
Total quality management (TQM)
 Warehouse management system (WMS)
Welfare management system (WMS)

References

Further reading 
 International Organization for Standardization (2001) Guidelines for the justification and development of management system standards. International Standard ISO Guide 72, Geneva, Switzerland.
 International Organization for Standardization (2004) Environmental Management Systems-Specifications with Guidance for Use. International Standard ISO 14001, Geneva, Switzerland.
 Commission for Environmental Cooperation (2000): “Improving Environmental Performance and Compliance: 10 Elements of Effective Environmental Management Systems.” Report.
 British Standards Institution (1999): Occupational health & safety management systems - Specification; BS OHSAS 18001:1999. 389 Chiswick High Road, London, W4 4AL, United Kingdom.
 International Organization for Standardization (2000) Quality Systems - Model for Quality Assurance in Design, Development, Production, Installation and Servicing.  International Standard ISO 9001:2000(E), Geneva, Switzerland.
 United States Department of Labor, Occupational Health and Safety Administration (1989); "Safety and Health Program Management Guidelines." Federal Register, January 26, 1989.
 United States Environmental Protection Agency (2001): “Integrated Environmental Management Systems: Implementation Guide.” Report written by Abt Associates for the USEPA’s Office of Pollution Prevention and Toxics, Design for the Environment Program; Economics, Exposure, and Technology Division.  Washington, DC.

 
Systems theory